Horsham Tanbridge & Broadbridge Heath is an electoral division of West Sussex in England, and returns one member to sit on West Sussex County Council.

Extent
The division covers the southwestern part of the town of Horsham and the village of Broadbridge Heath.

It comprises the following Horsham District wards: Broadbridge Heath Ward and Denne Ward; and of the following civil parishes: the southwestern part of Horsham, and Broadbridge Heath.

Election results

2013 Election
Results of the election held on 2 May 2013:

2009 Election
Results of the election held on 4 June 2009:

This division came into existence as the result of a boundary review recommended by the Boundary Committee for England, the results of which were accepted by the Electoral Commission in March 2009.

References
Election Results - West Sussex County Council

External links
 West Sussex County Council
 Election Maps

Electoral Divisions of West Sussex